Jackson Hole Community School is a small, college preparatory high school in Jackson, Wyoming, United States. It was founded by Scott "Profe" Hirschfield and has around 81 students and 4 grades as of 2019. It is accredited by the Northwest Association of Independent Schools.

References

External links 
 Jackson Hole Community School

High schools in Wyoming
Schools in Teton County, Wyoming